Rumpelstiltskin is the eighteenth soundtrack album by Tangerine Dream and forty-fifth overall.

In 1991, the US based Rabbit Ears label released the tale in their audio novel series for children. The story was told by actress Kathleen Turner and the accompanying music was composed and performed by Tangerine Dream exclusively for this recording. During the 22 minute story the material is used as background and intermediate music, and additionally the album features all seven compositions as instrumental tracks.

Track listing

Personnel
Edgar Froese
Jerome Froese

References

Tangerine Dream soundtracks
1991 soundtrack albums